Tony Simmons may refer to:

Tony Simmons (born 1974), former National Football and Canadian Football League wide receiver, current American football coach internationally
Tony Simmons (born 1948), British athlete

See also
Anthony Simmons (disambiguation)